The 2024 Iowa Republican presidential caucuses will be held on February 5, 2024, as part of the Republican Party primaries for the 2024 presidential election. 40 delegates to the 2024 Republican National Convention will be allocated on a proportional basis. As in past primary cycles, the Iowa caucus will be the first-in-the-nation Republican presidential primary caucus.

Background and electorate

History of the Iowa caucus 
Beginning in 1972, the Iowa caucuses have been characterized as the first major electoral test for both Democratic and Republican presidential contenders. Despite its strategic importance, between 1976 and 2016, only three out of eight winners of the Iowa caucuses went on to receive the Republican presidential nomination.

Republican electorate 
Matthew Dallek, a professor of political history at George Washington University, has argued that the Iowa Republican caucuses effectively serve as "referendums on who is the most socially conservative candidate" in the Republican field. 

Commentators have noted the decisive role of Evangelical Christian caucusgoers in past contests. The victory of social conservatives Mike Huckabee and Rick Santorum in the 2008 and 2012 Iowa caucuses, respectively, was credited to their strong support among evangelical voters. 

In 2016, it was noted by The Des Moines Register that almost half of likely Republican caucusgoers self-identify as evangelical or born-again Christians. In the 2016 Iowa Republican caucus, Senator Ted Cruz of Texas defeated eventual nominee Donald Trump by a 27.6% to 24.3% margin in what was considered an upset victory.

Candidates

Declared candidates 
Former President Donald Trump and former Governor of South Carolina and Ambassador to the United Nations Nikki Haley are the only main contenders to officially announce their candidacy so far.

Potential candidates 
Governor of Florida Ron DeSantis is widely expected to announce his candidacy as soon as May 2023. Commentators have described DeSantis as Trump's closest rival in the Republican primary based on primary polling taken in 2022 and 2023. Former Vice President Mike Pence is also considering a candidacy for the Republican nomination.

Other Republicans reportedly considering a candidacy include Senator Tim Scott of South Carolina; former Governors Chris Christie of New Jersey, Asa Hutchinson of Arkansas, former Secretary of State Mike Pompeo, incumbent Governors Glenn Youngkin of Virginia and Kristi Noem of South Dakota.

Campaign developments 
In February 2023, the Trump campaign announced its Iowa campaign staff, with state representative Bobby Kaufmann and consultant Eric Branstad, the son of former Governor Terry Branstad, serving as senior advisors. In March 2023, Trump's campaign announced that it would hold an "America First Education Policy" event in Davenport on March 13, marking his first official campaign appearance in the state. On March 13, 2023, Trump made his first appearance in the state since announcing his candidacy, in which he spoke before a crowd in Davenport. 

Governor of Florida Ron DeSantis, who has not declared his candidacy, held a pair of events in the state on March 10, and was accompanied by Governor Kim Reynolds. Former Secretary of State Mike Pompeo, another potential candidate, has visited Iowa a total of three times since leaving office.

Endorsements

Polling

See also 
 2024 Republican Party presidential primaries
 2024 United States presidential election
 2024 United States presidential election in Iowa
 2024 United States elections

References 

Iowa Republican caucuses
Republican presidential caucuses
Iowa